The 1940 Field Marshal Ceremony refers to a promotion ceremony held at the Kroll Opera House in Berlin in which Adolf Hitler promoted twelve generals to the rank of Generalfeldmarschall ("field marshal") on 19 July 1940. It was the first occasion in World War II that Hitler appointed field marshals due to military achievements.

The prestigious rank of field marshal had been banned after World War I. As part of German rearmament, the rank was revived. Hitler promoted twelve selected generals to field marshal during the ceremony in Berlin for their role in the swift victory in the Battle of France and to raise morale. The ceremony highlighted the power and prestige of the Wehrmacht; France was considered to have had the strongest army in Europe, yet had been humiliatingly defeated in just six weeks. The ceremony was the first time Hitler appointed field marshals due to military achievements and was celebrated like no other promotion ceremony of the war.

During the same ceremony, Göring, already Generalfeldmarschall since 1938, was promoted to the rank, newly-created especially for him, of Reichsmarschall.

Field marshal

After World War I, the prestigious rank of field marshal was banned in the Weimar Republic, alongside other restrictions of the Treaty of Versailles. After Hitler and the Nazi Party came to national power in January 1933, they began an expansion of the military; it was part of Hitler's desire to restore the army's power and prestige. In 1936, he revived the rank of field marshal. It was the highest and most prestigious military rank in Germany, originally only for the use of War Minister and Commander-in-Chief Werner von Blomberg. The traditional attribute distinguishing a German field marshal was an ornately decorated baton. More tangible benefits included a yearly salary of 36,000 Reichsmarks for life (a Field Marshal was deemed never to retire, but to remain permanently on active duty) and all earnings being exempt from income tax.

Ceremony 

Flushed with enthusiasm by the swift defeat of the French army, considered to have been the strongest in Europe, and the Low Countries in June 1940, Hitler wanted to mark the occasion with a grand promotion ceremony. He also hoped the promotions would strengthen his influence over the traditional German General Staff. The twelve generals chosen for promotion, who all had played an important role in the victory, were (with the position they occupied during the Battle of France):

 Colonel General Walther von Brauchitsch, Commander-in-chief of the Army
 Colonel General Fedor von Bock, Commander of Army Group B
 General of the Aviators Albert Kesselring, Commander of Air Fleet 2
 Colonel General Wilhelm Keitel, Chief of Staff of Hitler's Armed Forces High Command and de facto Minister for War
 Colonel General Günther von Kluge, Commander of the 4th Army
 Colonel General Wilhelm von Leeb, Commander of Army Group C
 Colonel General Wilhelm List, Commander of the 12th Army
 Colonel General Erhard Milch, Chief Under-Secretary of State in the Reich Aviation Ministry (de facto Air Force High Command)
 Field Marshal   Hermann Göring, Commander-in-chief of the Air Force
 Colonel General Walther von Reichenau, Commander of the 6th Army
 Colonel General Gerd von Rundstedt, Commander of Army Group A
 General of the Aviators Hugo Sperrle, Commander of Air Fleet 3
 Colonel General Erwin von Witzleben, Commander of the 1st Army

In particular, all Army Group commanders were promoted Field Marshal. In the case of Kesselring and Sperrle, the rank of Colonel General was bypassed. The commanders-in-chief of Navy and Air Force, Erich Raeder and Hermann Göring respectively, were not promoted Field Marshals because they already held the rank (or its equivalent Grand Admiral respectively). Given that Field Marshal was no longer as exceptional a rank as it was before, Göring, however, to satisfy his thirst for prestige, was promoted to the specially created rank of Reich Marshal. This made Göring the senior officer of the military, without, however, making him an actual superior of Army and Navy. It also underscored his status as Hitler's designated successor. He was the only person awarded this rank during the Nazi era, and it was abolished after the fall of the Nazi regime.

On 19 July 1940, Hitler summoned the generals to a ceremony in Berlin's Kroll Opera House (which housed the Reichstag after the Reichstag fire). After a speech regarding a peace proposal directed at Britain, Hitler personally rewarded his generals with their expensively decorated batons, and thanked them for their contributions to the victory.

The 1940 Field Marshal Ceremony was the first occasion Hitler appointed field marshals due to military achievements and was celebrated like no other promotion ceremony in Germany. The remaining five years of the war saw an additional twelve promotions, most of which were without ceremony, such as Friedrich Paulus's promotion, which was conferred over the radio by Hitler.

Aftermath
All of the generals promoted went on to achieve further success in their careers during the early years of victory which the German military obtained in the Second World War. Brauchitsch, Bock, Kesselring, Keitel, Leeb, List, Reichenau, Rundstedt, and Göring would all play decisive and important roles in the German-led Axis invasion of the Soviet Union in 1941. Sperrle spent the rest of the war in semi-retirement, based with his unit in France. Milch was transferred to the production department and was responsible for aircraft production until the end of the war. Following his avid extermination of Jews in the autumn of 1941 (Severity Order, Babi Yar), Reichenau died on 14 January 1942. In 1943, after a series of German defeats on the Eastern Front, and the Allied invasion of Italy, the German military lost all initiative. Hitler's leadership became increasingly disconnected from reality as the war turned against Germany, with the military's defensive strategies often hindered by his slow decision making and frequent directives to hold untenable positions. His response to the worsening war situation was to unceremoniously sack general after general, a routine which ultimately affected the field marshals promoted at the ceremony. Erwin von Witzleben and Günther von Kluge were both involved in the 20 July Plot to assassinate Hitler. After it became clear that the assassination attempt had failed, Kluge committed suicide by taking cyanide poison on 17 August 1944. Witzleben was to have become Commander-in-Chief of the Wehrmacht if the attempt had succeeded. He was arrested, stripped of his rank and expelled from the Army so that he could be tried in a civilian court, and sentenced to death; the execution was carried out on 8 August 1944. On 4 May 1945, less than a week before Nazi Germany surrendered, Bock died of wounds inflicted the day before by a strafing British fighter-bomber.

See also 
 List of Nazi Party leaders and officials

Footnotes

References

Sources

External links
 1940 Field Marshal Ceremony on YouTube

1940 in Germany
Military history of Germany during World War II
July 1940 events